The Kaushalya river, a tributary of Ghaggar river, is a river in Panchkula district  of Haryana state of India.

Origin and route
The Kaushalya river rises in the Shivalik hills on the border of Haryana and Himachal Pradesh State, and flows through Panchkula district and converges with Ghaggar river near Pinjore just downstream of Kaushalya Dam.

The basin is classified in two parts, Khadir and Bangar, the higher area that is not flooded in rainy season is called Bangar and the lower flood-prone area is called Khadar.

Several archaeologists have identified the old Ghaggar-Hakra River with the Sarasvati river, on the banks of which the Indus Valley civilisation developed.

Gallery

See also 

 Western Yamuna Canal, branches off Yamuna
 Dangri, a tributary of Sarsuti
 Tangri river, a tributary of Sarsuti, merge if Dangri and Tangri are same 
 Markanda river, a tributary of Ghaggar-Hakra River
 Sarsuti, a tributary of Ghaggar-Hakra River 
 Chautang, a tributary of Ghaggar-Hakra River
 Sutlej, a tributary of Indus
 Ganges
 Indus

References

External links 

Rivers of Himachal Pradesh
Rivers of Haryana
Rigvedic rivers
Indus basin
International rivers of Asia
Sarasvati River
Rivers of India